Mariano Bettini (born 19 January 1996) is an Argentine professional footballer who plays as a right-back for Tristán Suárez.

Career
Bettini came through the youth ranks of Boca Juniors. On 6 August 2017, Bettini completed a move to Primera B Metropolitana side Atlanta. His professional debut arrived on 4 September 2017 in a home victory over Colegiales, playing the full duration of a fixture which originally ended in goalless draw before the AFA awarded Atlanta the three points - Colegiales had selected an ineligible player in Germán Mendoza.

Career statistics
.

References

External links

1996 births
Living people
Footballers from Buenos Aires
Argentine footballers
Association football defenders
Primera B Metropolitana players
Club Atlético Atlanta footballers
CSyD Tristán Suárez footballers